Robert Broderick James McIntosh (6 May 1950 – 23 September 1974) was a Scottish drummer from Dundee, who was a founder-member of the Average White Band (AWB). His father was American-born actor Bonar Colleano, who had a successful career in films, especially in the UK. 

Before going on to help found the AWB in 1971-72, McIntosh had been a member of the late 1960s bands the Senate with Alex Ligertwood, and Mal and the Primitives, followed by Brian Auger's Oblivion Express, appearing on the band's early albums Oblivion Express (1971), Better Land (1971) and Second Wind (1972). While working with the AWB, he also recorded two tracks that appear on the Herbie Mann album London Underground (1973).

McIntosh died of an accidental heroin overdose, at a party following a concert at the Troubadour in Los Angeles. According to a contemporary report in Time, McIntosh and fellow band member Alan Gorrie took what they thought was cocaine, but was in fact heroin; Gorrie was saved by the intervention of fellow party-goer Cher, who kept him conscious long enough to recover. The party host, 30-year-old millionaire Kenneth Moss, was subsequently indicted for murder by a grand jury.  Moss pleaded guilty to involuntary manslaughter and was sentenced to 120 days in jail and four years' probation.

McIntosh is buried in Barnhill Cemetery, Dundee. His replacement as drummer in the AWB was Steve Ferrone.

Discography

With Herbie Mann
London Underground (Atlantic, 1973)
'With Chuck BerryThe London Chuck Berry Sessions'' (Chess, 1972)

References

External links
The Gazetteer for Scotland

1950 births
1974 deaths
Scottish drummers
British male drummers
Musicians from Dundee
Average White Band members
20th-century Scottish musicians
Deaths by heroin overdose in California
Drug-related deaths in California
20th-century drummers
Accidental deaths in California
20th-century British male musicians
British manslaughter victims